Ann Meekitjuk Hanson  (born May 22, 1946, in Qaktut, Northwest Territories, now Nunavut) was the third commissioner of Nunavut. She served from April 21, 2005, until April 10, 2010. Hanson, like all Inuit born between the 1940s and the 1970s, was labelled with a disc number by the Government of Canada, which, in her case was E7-121.

She spent the first 11 years of her life speaking only Inuktitut and living in Qakutut and Kimmirut. She attended schools in Iqaluit, Baker Lake (Qamanituaq), and Toronto, where she was known as Annie Cotterill. She studied community development at Saint Francis Xavier University, geography at the University of Windsor and received a diploma with honors in journalism from Nunavut Arctic College.

Hanson's career has been diverse. She has been a civil servant, broadcaster, journalist and author. She has used her skills in Inuktitut throughout her career. Joining the federal government in 1964, she served as a secretary and interpreter/translator in the office of Northwest Territories MP Eugène Rhéaume.

Hanson appeared, credited under a pseudonym "Pilitak", as the character Neevee in the 1974 film The White Dawn, which featured many Inuit actors speaking Inuktitut. She later said that the experience for the Frobisher Bay (now Iqaluit) community was "a renaissance back to our language".

She joined the Canadian Broadcasting Corporation as a receptionist, later becoming an announcer and producer in Inuktitut broadcasting. Hanson was the first editor of the Iqaluit community newspaper Inukshuk, which later became Nunatsiaq News. She is the author of Show Me, a book written in Inuktitut and English.

In addition to her work in journalism, Hanson also served with the government of the Northwest Territories as a community development worker, counsellor and deputy commissioner.

Hanson has spent considerable time as a volunteer, helping to start a number of organizations in Iqaluit. These organizations include the Juvenile Court Committee, the Elders Group, the Inuit Cultural Group, and the Quinuajuaq Society.

Hanson's work in community development and the continuation of Inuit heritage was recognized in 2003 when she became a Member of the Order of Canada.

Hanson lives in Iqaluit with her husband, Robert Hanson. They have five grown daughters.

Arms

See also
Notable Aboriginal people of Canada

References

1946 births
Living people
Commissioners of Nunavut
Inuit politicians
Writers from the Northwest Territories
Writers from Nunavut
Women in Nunavut politics
Inuit writers
Northwest Territories Deputy Commissioners
Canadian Inuit women
Inuit from the Northwest Territories
Inuit from Nunavut
People from Kimmirut
People from Iqaluit